Mark Farr (born 1968) is an Irish retired Gaelic footballer. His league and championship career with the Cork senior team lasted from 1993 until 1997.

Farr made his debut on the inter-county scene at the age of seventeen when he was selected for the Cork minor team. He enjoyed one championship season with the minor team, however, he was an All-Ireland runner-up. Farr subsequently joined the Cork under-21 team, winning a Munster medal in 1989. By this stage he was also a regular on the Cork junior team and won back-to-back All-Ireland medals in 1989 and 1990. Farr made his senior debut during the 1993 championship. An All-Ireland runner-up in his debut season, he won three Munster medals before leaving the panel in 1997.

Honours

Dohenys
 Cork Intermediate Football Championship (1): 1995
 Cork Junior Football Championship (1): 1993

Cork
 Munster Senior Football Championship (3): 1993, 1994, 1995
 All-Ireland Junior Football Championship (2): 1989, 1990
 Munster Junior Football Championship (4): 1988, 1989, 1990, 1992
 Munster Under-21 Football Championship (1): 1989
 Munster Minor Football Championship (1): 1986

References

1968 births
Living people
Dohenys Gaelic footballers
Cork inter-county Gaelic footballers
Munster inter-provincial Gaelic footballers